Friedrich Hans Ulrich Mühe (20 June 1953 – 22 July 2007) was a German film, television and theatre actor. He played the role of Hauptmann (Captain) Gerd Wiesler in the Oscar-winning film Das Leben der Anderen (The Lives of Others, 2006), for which he received the gold award for Best Performance by an Actor in a Leading Role, at the Deutscher Filmpreis (German Film Awards); and the Best Actor Award at the 2006 European Film Awards.

After leaving school, Mühe was employed as a construction worker and a border guard at the Berlin Wall. He then turned to acting, and from the late 1970s into the 1980s appeared in numerous plays, becoming a star of the Deutsches Theater in East Berlin. He was active in politics and denounced Communist rule in East Germany in a memorable address at the Alexanderplatz demonstration on 4 November 1989 shortly before the fall of the Berlin Wall. After German reunification he continued to appear in a large number of films, television programmes and theatre productions. In Germany he was particularly known for playing the lead role of Dr. Robert Kolmaar in the long-running forensic crime series Der letzte Zeuge (The Last Witness, 1998–2007).

Early life and education

The son of a furrier, Mühe was born on 20 June 1953 in Grimma, Bezirk Leipzig (part of present-day Saxony), in the German Democratic Republic (East Germany). After leaving school, he trained as a construction worker, then did compulsory military service in the Nationale Volksarmee (National People's Army) as a border guard at the Berlin Wall. He was relieved of duty after contracting stomach ulcers; possibly due to stress, according to observers, and also suggested that it marked the beginnings of the stomach cancer that would eventually lead to his death.

He then turned to acting, and studied at the Theaterhochschule "Hans Otto" Leipzig from 1975 to 1979. He appeared in his first professional stage role in 1979, as Lyngstrand in Ibsen's Fruen fra havet (The Lady from the Sea) at the Städtisches Theater in Karl-Marx-Stadt (now Chemnitz). He followed this by appearing in a production of Macbeth by playwright and director Heiner Müller at the Volksbühne in East Berlin.

Career

In 1983, at Müller's invitation he joined the ensemble of East Berlin's Deutsches Theater, and became its star due to his versatility in comic and serious roles, appearing in productions such as Goethe's Egmont (1986), Ibsen's Peer Gynt and Lessing's Nathan der Weise (Nathan the Wise, 1988). He took the lead role of Hamlet in both Shakespeare's play and Heiner Müller's Die Hamletmaschine (Hamletmachine, 1989). Mühe later said: "Theatre was the only place in the GDR where people weren't lied to. For us actors it was an island. We could dare to criticise." On screen, he co-starred with his second wife Jenny Gröllmann in Herman Zschoche's film  (Half of Life, 1984) about the German lyric poet Friedrich Hölderlin (1770–1843).

Mühe played a leading role in organizing the demonstrations that took place prior to the reunification of Germany. He often gave public readings from Walter Jenka's essay Schwierigkeiten mit der Wahrheit (Difficulties with the Truth, 1989) at the Deutsches Theater, before the book was permitted to be published in East Germany. On 4 November 1989, shortly before the fall of the Berlin Wall, in front of half a million people during the Alexanderplatz demonstration, he declared the Communists' monopoly on power to be invalid. In the same year, he became internationally known after playing, next to Armin Mueller-Stahl and Klaus Maria Brandauer, the leading role in Bernhard Wicki's Das Spinnennetz (Spider's Web, based on the expressionist, fragmentary novel of the same name by Austrian writer Joseph Roth) the right-wing lieutenant Lohse who sleeps and murders his way to professional success in the early Weimar Republic following a near fatal injury during the Wilhelmshaven mutiny of 29 October 1918.

After German reunification, he continued to appear in a large number of films, television programmes and theatre productions in Germany and abroad. He proved his ability to take on comic roles in Schtonk! (1991), an Oscar-nominated satire about the Hitler Diaries hoax, and showed his more serious side in Michael Haneke's Benny's Video (1992), Das Schloss (The Castle, 1996) (an adaptation of Kafka's The Castle (1922)) and Funny Games (1997). In the latter film, Mühe and his third wife Susanne Lothar played a husband and wife held captive in their holiday cabin by two psychotic young men who force them to play sadistic "games" with one another.

In the 2000s, Mühe played Nazis in a sequence of films. He portrayed Joseph Goebbels in Goebbels und Geduldig (Goebbels and Geduldig, 2001); Dr. Josef Mengele in Amen. (2002), a film by Costa Gavras; and was to have played Klaus Barbie in an upcoming feature. His last film was the comedy Mein Führer – Die wirklich wahrste Wahrheit über Adolf Hitler (My Führer: The Truly Truest Truth about Adolf Hitler, 2007), in which he played Prof. Adolf Israel Grünbaum, an actor hired to give Hitler lessons.

In 2006, he appeared at the Barbican Arts Centre in London in Zerbombt, Thomas Ostermeier's German production of Sarah Kane's Blasted, playing a middle-aged journalist whose encounter with a young girl leads to pandemonium in a Leeds hotel room.

Mühe was known in Germany for playing the brilliant but eccentric pathologist Dr. Robert Kolmaar in 73 episodes of the forensic crime serial Der letzte Zeuge (The Last Witness, 1998–2007), for which he was awarded the prize for Beste/r Schauspieler/in in einer Serie (Best Actor or Actress in a TV Series) at the Deutscher Fernsehpreis (German Television Awards) in 2005.

The Lives of Others, and later life

To English-speaking audiences, Mühe was probably best known for portraying Hauptmann (Captain) Gerd Wiesler in Florian Henckel von Donnersmarck's Das Leben der Anderen (The Lives of Others, 2006), which won the Academy Award for Best Foreign Language Film in 2007. The film is set in the mid-1980s, and Wiesler is a Stasi agent who is assigned to bug and conduct surveillance of the apartment of an East German playwright, Georg Dreyman (Sebastian Koch), and his girlfriend, the actress Christa-Maria Sieland (Martina Gedeck). However, he becomes disillusioned about the necessity of monitoring the couple for national security reasons after discovering that the government minister who ordered the surveillance did so for sexual rather than political motives. Gradually, Wiesler's heart moves from contempt and envy to compassion. For his performance, in 2006 Mühe received, among other things, the Beste darstellerische Leistung – Männliche Hauptrolle (Best Performance by an Actor in a Leading Role), Gold, at Germany's most prestigious film awards, the Deutscher Filmpreis (German Film Awards); and the Best Actor Award at the European Film Awards.

The Bundesstiftung zur Aufarbeitung der SED-Diktatur (Federal Foundation for the Reappraisal of the SED Dictatorship, known in short as "Stiftung Aufarbeitung"), the government-funded organization tasked with examining and reappraising East Germany's Communist dictatorship, said of Mühe: "Through his impressive performance... Ulrich Mühe sensitized an audience of millions to the Stasi's machinations and their consequences." The statement added that Mühe had been an active and valued participant in the foundation's events.

Mühe was already seriously ill at the award ceremony in Los Angeles in February 2007 when Das Leben der Anderen was awarded its Oscar, and flew back to Germany hours later for an urgent stomach operation. In an article in Die Welt dated 21 July 2007, Mühe discussed his diagnosis of stomach cancer which had put his acting career on hold; he died the following day. On 25 July 2007, he was buried in his mother's village of Walbeck in the Landkreis (rural district) of Börde, Saxony-Anhalt.

Personal life
Mühe was married three times. He was first married to dramaturge Annegret Hahn; the couple had two sons: Andreas, a Berlin-based photographer, and Konrad, a painter. His second marriage was in 1984 to the actress Jenny Gröllmann, after they fell in love while acting together in the TV film Die Poggenpuhls (The Poggenpuhls) in that year. Mühe and Gröllmann had a daughter, Anna Maria Mühe, who is also an actress; and he was stepfather to Gröllmann's daughter Jeanne, a make-up artist.

After German reunification, Mühe allegedly discovered evidence in his Stasi file that he had been under surveillance not only by four of his fellow actors in the East Berlin theatre, but also by his wife Gröllmann. The file held detailed records of meetings that Gröllmann, who was registered as an "Inoffizieller Mitarbeiter" (unofficial collaborator), had with her controller from 1979 to 1989. This mirrored the plot of Das Leben der Anderen as in the film pressure exerted by the Stasi on the playwright's girlfriend makes her betray him as the author of an exposé of covered-up GDR suicide rates. Mühe and Gröllmann divorced in 1990. In a book accompanying the film, Mühe spoke about the sense of betrayal he felt when he found out about his former wife's alleged Stasi role. However, Gröllmann's real-life controller later claimed he had made up many of the details in the file and that the actress had been unaware that she was speaking to a Stasi agent. After a highly public and acrimonious battle in the courts, Gröllmann, who died in August 2006, won an injunction preventing the book's publication. Mühe's response when asked how he prepared for his role in Das Leben der Anderen was, "I remembered."

At the time of his death, Mühe was married to his third wife, actress Susanne Lothar, and living in Berlin with her and their two children, Sophie Marie and Jakob. Mühe and Lothar starred together in Mühe's last film, Nemesis (2010), which deals with a couple's troubled relationship. However, Lothar, who died in 2012, launched a lawsuit to block the film from release for nearly three years, apparently because she felt that it would cast the couple in a bad light.

Awards
In addition to the awards mentioned elsewhere in this article, Mühe was conferred the following awards:

1990 – The Chaplin Shoe, the Deutscher Darstellerpreis (German Actor Award) of the Bundesverbandes der Fernseh- und Filmregisseure in Deutschland eV (Federal Association of Television and Film Directors in Germany).
1991 – The Gertrud-Eysoldt-Ring (Gertrud Eysoldt Ring)
1992 – The Bambi
1994 – The Kainz-Medaille (Kainz Medal)
2006 – The Bernhard-Wicki-Filmpreis (Bernhard Wicki Film Award)
The Helene-Weigel-Medaille (Helene Weigel Medal)
The prize of the critics of the Berliner Zeitung

Filmography

Film

Television

Retrieved on 23 September 2007.

Theatre

Audio books

References

Further reading

 

 In German.

External links

Dreaming Ulrich – an unofficial fan-site

Photographs of Ulrich Mühe at Virtual History Film
Official English website of Das Leben der Anderen (The Lives of Others, 2006)
Official German website of Das Leben der Anderen (The Lives of Others, 2006)

1953 births
2007 deaths
Theaterhochschule Leipzig alumni
East German dissidents
European Film Award for Best Actor winners
People from Grimma
German anti-communists
German male film actors
German male stage actors
German male television actors
20th-century German male actors
21st-century German male actors
Members of the Academy of Arts, Berlin
German Film Award winners
Deaths from cancer in Germany
Deaths from stomach cancer